Aayirappara is a 1993 Malayalam film directed by Venu Nagavalli, starring Mammootty, Urvashi and Madhu in the lead roles. The movie was produced by Sreekanth and Ashok under the banner of Gauridarshana and it has been distributed by Mak Release.

Cast

Soundtrack 
The songs in this movie were written by Kavalam Narayana Panicker and composed by Raveendran. The songs have been distributed by C. C. Audios. The background score also was by Raveendran.

Awards 
 1993 Kerala State Film Award for Best Actor - Mammootty

External links 
 

1993 films
1990s Malayalam-language films
Films shot in Alappuzha
Films directed by Venu Nagavally
Films scored by Raveendran